David C. Gunther (born July 22, 1937) is American former basketball player and coach.  He served as the head basketball coach at the University of North Dakota from 1970 to 1988.  Gunther played college basketball at the University of Iowa and professional basketball with the San Francisco Warriors of the National Basketball Association (NBA).

Early years
Gunther was born in 1937 and attended Le Mars High School in Le Mars, Iowa. He attended Le Mars High School and, as a senior, was selected as the first-team center on the 1955 All-Iowa basketball team.

College career
He enrolled at the University of Iowa and played for the Iowa Hawkeyes men's basketball team at the forward position from 1956 to 1959. He scored 271 points (12.3 average) as a sophomore, 435 points (19.8 average) as a junior, and 482 points as a senior (21.9 average). He ranked 19th nationally in scoring during the 1958–59 season. He was selected as Iowa's most valuable player three consecutive years. He closed his college career with 1,188 points, tying the Iowa career scoring record set by Bill Logan from 1954 to 1956.

Professional basketball
He was selected by the Philadelphia Warriors in the eighth round of the 1959 NBA draft but Gunther stated at the time that he was not interested in playing professional basketball. In the fall of 1959, after completing a tour of military service with the U.S Army, Gunther joined the Cleveland Pipers of the National Industrial Basketball League.

In June 1960, the Detroit Pistons purchased rights to Gunther from the Philadelphia Warriors. He played a portion of the season with the Pistons before being sold to the Williamsport Billies of the Eastern Professional Basketball League (EBL). He was selected as rookie of the year in the EBL.

In May 1961, the San Francisco Saints of the American Basketball League outbid the Pistons to sign Gunther. His season was cut short when he was called back into military service.

In 1962, he concluded his professional basketball career with the San Francisco Warriors of the NBA.

Coaching career
After his playing career ended, Gunther worked as a basketball coach. He began his coaching career in 1963 as a head coach at Charles City High School in Charles City, Iowa. He next served as head basketball coach at Kimball High School in Royal Oak, Michigan, from 1964 to 1967. 

In August 1967, he was hired as the head basketball coach at Wayne State College in Wayne, Nebraska. He served as head coach at Wayne State for three  years, compiling a 70–12 record. He was selected as the Nebraska coach of the year in 1968 by the Lincoln Journal and in 1969 by the Omaha World Herald.

In the spring of 1970, Gunther was hired as the head basketball coach at the University of North Dakota. He continued to hold that position for 18 years until his retirement in March 1988. He compiled a 332–117 record at North Dakota.

In 1993, Gunther was hired as head basketball coach at Buena Vista in Storm Lake, Iowa. He led Buena Vista to a 25–25 overall record in two seasons. In March 1995, he was named head basketball coach at Bemidji State University. He retired in 2001 after six years at Bemidji.

References

External links
 NBA career stats

1937 births
Living people
American men's basketball coaches
American men's basketball players
Basketball coaches from Iowa
Basketball players from Iowa
Bemidji State Beavers men's basketball coaches
Buena Vista Beavers men's basketball coaches
Forwards (basketball)
High school basketball coaches in the United States
Iowa Hawkeyes men's basketball players
North Dakota Fighting Hawks athletic directors
North Dakota Fighting Hawks men's basketball coaches
People from Le Mars, Iowa
Philadelphia Warriors draft picks
San Francisco Saints players
San Francisco Warriors players
Wayne State Wildcats men's basketball coaches